Qingdao International Yacht Club is a yacht club located in Qingdao, Shandong, China.  The yacht club is home to China Team which competed in the 2007 Louis Vuitton Cup to challenge for the America's Cup.

External links 
 Archive of website

Yacht clubs in China
Sport in Qingdao
2005 establishments in China